Richard Hubert Bruck (December 26, 1914 – December 18, 1991) was an American mathematician best known for his work in the field of algebra, especially in its relation to projective geometry and combinatorics.

Bruck studied at the University of Toronto, where he received his doctorate in 1940 under the supervision of Richard Brauer.
He spent most his career as a professor at University of Wisconsin–Madison, advising at least 31 doctoral students.

He is best known for his 1949 paper coauthored with H. J. Ryser, the results of which became known as the Bruck–Ryser theorem (now known in a generalized form as the Bruck-Ryser-Chowla theorem), concerning the possible orders of finite projective planes.

In 1946, he was awarded a Guggenheim Fellowship.
In 1956, he was awarded the Chauvenet Prize for his article Recent Advances in the Foundations of Euclidean Plane Geometry. In 1962, he was an invited speaker at the International Congress of Mathematicians in Stockholm.
In 1963, he was a Fulbright Lecturer at the University of Canberra.
In 1965 a Groups and Geometry conference was held at the University of Wisconsin in honor of Bruck's retirement.

Dick Bruck and his wife Helen were supporters of the fine arts. They were patrons of the regional American Players Theatre in Wisconsin.

Selected publications 
 
 
 
 
 
 
 
  (3rd ed. in 1971)

Notes

External links 
 Biography at the University of Texas
 Bruck–Ryser–Chowla Theorem at Mathworld

1914 births
1991 deaths
20th-century American mathematicians
University of Wisconsin–Madison faculty
University of Toronto alumni
Combinatorialists